The Protectors is a British television series, an action thriller created by Gerry Anderson. It was Anderson's second TV series to exclusively use live actors as opposed to marionettes (following UFO), and his second to be firmly set in contemporary times (following The Secret Service). It was also the only Gerry Anderson–produced television series that was not of the fantasy or science fiction genres. It was produced by Lew Grade's ITC Entertainment production company. Despite not featuring marionettes or any real science fiction elements, The Protectors became one of Anderson's most popular productions, easily winning a renewal for a second series. A third series was in the planning stages when the show's major sponsor, Brut, ended its funding and thus forced the series' cancellation.

The Protectors was first broadcast in 1972 and 1973, and ran to 52 episodes over two series, each 25 minutes long—making it one of the last series of this type to be produced in a half-hour format. It starred Robert Vaughn (of The Man from U.N.C.L.E. fame) as Harry Rule, Nyree Dawn Porter (co-star of The Forsyte Saga) as the Contessa Caroline di Contini, and Tony Anholt (later to star in Space: 1999 and Howards' Way) as Paul Buchet. Episodes often featured prominent guest actors.

Premise
Three inexplicably affluent international private detectives/troubleshooters are charged with ensuring the protection of innocents. They belong to an organisation called The Protectors, based in London. Harry Rule leads the group. The Contessa lives in Italy (when she is not working with Harry). She runs her own detective agency, which specializes in exposing art frauds and recovering stolen art. Paul Buchet works out of Paris, and is the group's researcher and gadget specialist. Adventures range from simple kidnapping to convoluted cases of international intrigue. These characters are all very wealthy and drive exotic cars of the era, such as the Citroën SM and Jensen Interceptor.

The show was parodied in two episodes of the 1996 BBC Radio 4 comedy series Fab TV: "The Preventers" and "The Return of the Preventers".

Production
According to co-producer Gerry Anderson, the show's format was outlined in a brief note that Lew Grade gave him, and he was then given a free hand to develop it, although Grade ultimately cast two of the main actors himself. The format of the series allowed for occasional episodes in which not all of the main actors appeared, including two in which Vaughn's character was absent.

Like The Persuaders!, a similar series also produced by ITC that aired around the same time, The Protectors was shot on location at numerous "exotic" locations throughout Europe, such as Salzburg, Rome, Malta and Paris, giving the series a sixties "jet set" feel (it was also the first Anderson production to have such a luxury). In order to offset the cost of location filming, and also perhaps because the equipment was more portable, the series was shot on 16mm film rather than the usual 35mm.

The episodes aimed at fast-paced action set against an international background, incorporating elements from both private-eye detective shows and espionage shows, but within a half-hour format. The lack of screen time, compared with the 50-minute timeslot used by shows like The Persuaders! or Department S, resulted in plots that were rather simplistic, with motivation and characterisation sacrificed for action, owing to the writers having to cram as much as possible into a 25-minute timeslot and still produce gripping television. Accordingly, the series suffered from most of the same drawbacks that beset The Adventurer, another half-hour ITC show that aired at the same time.

The theme tune of the series, "Avenues and Alleyways", was a minor hit for Tony Christie (and was successfully revived by Christie in the 2000s, thanks in part to its use in the soundtrack to the film Love, Honour and Obey). This was the first Anderson series not to feature music composed by Barry Gray.

Courtfield Mews, London SW5 was used as the filming location for The Protectors headquarters.

In Germany the series was known as Kein Pardon für Schutzengel (meaning "No Mercy for Guardian Angels") and in France as Poigne de fer et séduction ("Iron Fist and Seduction"). This highlights another snag which bedevilled the show: its English title, The Protectors, could imply that Robert Vaughn was playing a bodyguard, in a more serious version of the 1980s ITV show Minder, but very few of the episodes cast Vaughn's team in the role of bodyguards: hence the title made little sense, and was actually misleading for casual viewers. (A similar issue relates to the title of the TV series, The Avengers; beyond a story arc at the very beginning of the series in 1961, the lead characters were primarily investigators and rarely actually "avenged" anyone.)

In South Africa, the series was dubbed into Afrikaans as Die Beskermers (the literal translation of The Protectors) and was popular on the fledgling South African Broadcasting Corporation.

As was the case for most of Anderson's series, in the United States the series was not broadcast on network television, but aired instead in first-run syndication. This made it more difficult for the show to make any impact in America, despite its popular American star, and this hurt its overseas sales.

Actor relationships
According to Robert Vaughn's autobiography, there were many problems between the actor and both the show's financier, Lew Grade, and its co-producer, Gerry Anderson. Anderson claimed in his own autobiography that Vaughn acted like a Hollywood prima donna and refused to get along with the other actors; but John Hough (who directed several episodes, and the opening title sequence of the series) had many more problems with Vaughn's business partner, Sherwood Price, than with Vaughn himself. Vaughn claimed that he felt the series was "tasteless junk", and that he could not understand the scripts either before or during shooting.

Vaughn was given the opportunity to direct one episode himself—number 23 in production order, "It Could Be Practically Anywhere on the Island". On this production he met actress Linda Staab; they married three years later, and remained married until his death 42 years later in 2016. Although Vaughn had a better relationship with Grade, the mogul called "It Could Be Practically..." the worst episode he had ever seen of anything; Vaughn himself was less than fond of it. 

Anderson's relationship with series regular Tony Anholt was a more positive one, and a few years later he cast the actor as Tony Verdeschi in the second series of Space: 1999.

Episodes

Series 1 (1972–73)

Series 2 (1973–74)

Home media
ITV Studios Home Entertainment released the entire series on DVD in Region 2 in 2002/2003.

Network released a seven-disc Region 2 DVD set in 2010, comprising both series.

In Region 1, A&E Home Entertainment, under licence from Carlton International Media Limited, released the entire 52 episodes on Region 1 DVD for the first time ever, in two complete season sets, in 2003/2004.

On 10 September 2014, it was announced that VEI Entertainment had acquired the rights to the series in Region 1, and would re-release all 52 episodes on DVD on 4 November 2014.

Music
In 2009, Network released a five-disc set of music recorded for the series, featuring Tony Christie's "Avenues and Alleyways", library music and scores for 13 episodes composed by John Cameron, and Eartha Kitt's rendition of "My Man's Gone Now" for the episode "A Pocketful of Posies".

References

External links

1970s British drama television series
1972 British television series debuts
1974 British television series endings
AP Films
British action television series
Television shows shot at EMI-Elstree Studios
English-language television shows
Espionage television series
Fictional private investigators
First-run syndicated television programs in the United States
ITV television dramas
Television series by ITC Entertainment
Television shows set in London
British detective television series